Placentia—St. Mary's is a provincial electoral district for the House of Assembly of Newfoundland and Labrador, Canada. As of 2011, there were 7,361 eligible voters living within the district.

Placentia and St. Mary's includes the former U.S. naval base at Argentia, as well as Voisey Bay Nickel's planned processing facility at Long Harbour. Communities include: Admiral's Beach, Angel's Cove, Argentia, Branch, Coote Pond, Colinet, Cuslett, Dunville, Forest Field, Freshwater, Fox Harbour, Gaskiers, Great Barasway, Harricott, Jerseyside, Little Barasway, Mall Bay, Mitchell's Brook, Mount Carmel, New Bridge, North Harbour, O'Donnells, Patrick's Cove, Peter's River, Placentia, Point Verde, Point Le Haye, Point Lance, Riverhead, Ship Cove, Ship Harbour, St. Bride's, St. Catherine's, St. Mary's, St. Joseph's, St. Stephen's and St. Vincent's.

Placentia and St. Mary's is a Tory stronghold, but many constituents backed rebel MHA Fabian Manning, who was ejected from the PC caucus in 2005 after splitting with Premier Danny Williams on fisheries policies. The district is currently held by Liberal MHA and former Cabinet Minister Sherry Gambin-Walsh.

Members of the House of Assembly

Former District of St. Mary's/St. Mary's - The Capes

Election results 

|-

|-
 
|NDP
|Jennifer Coultas
|align="right"|812
|align="right"|20.83
|align="right"|
|- bgcolor="white"
!align="left" colspan=3|Total
!align="right"|3,098
!align="right"|100.0%
!align="right"|
|}

|-

|-

|Independent
|Nick Careen
|align="right"|1,641
|align="right"|33.8
|align="right"|
|-

|- bgcolor="white"
!align="left" colspan=3|Total
!align="right"|4,850
!align="right"|100.0%
!align="right"|
|}

|-

|-

|-
 
|NDP
|Janet Stringer
|align="right"|152
|align="right"|2.66
|align="right"|
|- bgcolor="white"
!align="left" colspan=3|Total
!align="right"|5,710
!align="right"|100.0%
!align="right"|
|}

|-

|-

|-
|- bgcolor="white"
!align="left" colspan=3|Total
!align="right"|6,517
!align="right"|100.0%
!align="right"|
|}

References

External links 
Website of the Newfoundland and Labrador House of Assembly
Map of Placentia—St. Mary's riding as of 2015, from Elections NL

Newfoundland and Labrador provincial electoral districts